Thomas Mathews (born November 28, 1958) is an American actor best known for his roles as Tommy Jarvis in the Friday the 13th franchise—in particular Friday the 13th Part VI: Jason Lives (1986)—and Freddy in The Return of the Living Dead (1985). His other film roles include  Dangerously Close (1986), Return of the Living Dead Part II (1988), and Nemesis (1992).

Career

Acting and Friday the 13th 
Mathews began his acting career in the early 1980s as a model and commercial actor, starring in national television commercials for Le Tigre, Sprite and Tostitos. From 1982 to 1984, Mathews guest starred on a string of soap operas including Falcon Crest (1982; 1984), Dynasty (1983) and Paper Dolls (1984). In 1984, Mathews portrayed Erik in the romantic comedy film The Woman in Red although he was uncredited.

His first major role was Freddy in the 1985 cult film The Return of the Living Dead. The following year, Mathews starred in Friday the 13th Part VI: Jason Lives, being the third actor to portray Tommy Jarvis after Corey Feldman and John Shepherd.  In 1987, he starred as Francis Kelly in the television film The Dirty Dozen: The Deadly Mission. The same year, Mathews starred in the film Down Twisted and guest starred on the sitcom Mr. President. In 1988, he starred as Joey in Return of the Living Dead Part II and Charmin' in Alien from L.A.. In 1989, Mathews guest starred on an episode of CBS Summer Playhouse.

In 1990, he portrayed Tim Murphy in the television film Rock Hudson, Sonny Hilderbrand in the television pilot Sporting Chance, and David in the film  Midnight Cabaret. The following year, Mathews starred in the films Bloodmatch and Born to Ride and the television short The Letters from Moab. In 1992, he starred in the film Nemesis. In 1994, he portrayed Bill in Kickboxer 4 and Dan Donahue in In the Living Years. The following year, Mathews starred in Heatseeker. The same year, he guest starred on an episode of ER. In 1996, Mathews starred in the television films If Looks Could Kill and Raven Hawk.

He reprised the role of Tommy Jarvis twice in 2017, providing his voice and likeness to the video game Friday the 13th: The Game and making a cameo appearance in the unofficial fan film Never Hike Alone and its 2020 prequel, Never Hike in the Snow. He repeated the role of Tommy Jarvis in 2022 in another unofficial fan film Vengeance Part 2: Bloodlines and he is to star in the sequel Never Hike Alone 2, set to release in October 2023. Mathews now owns a construction company, Hammer and Trowel. Sharon and Ozzy Osbourne hired his company to remodel their home during the filming of their MTV reality show The Osbournes.

Personal life
On May 10, 2014, Mathews married Karla Jensen in Los Cabos Municipality, Mexico.

Filmography

References

External links

Living people
American male film actors
American male television actors
American male video game actors
Male actors from Los Angeles
Fairfax High School (Los Angeles) alumni
1958 births